The term "coadjutor" (literally "co-assister" in Latin) is a title qualifier indicating that the holder shares the office with another person, with powers equal to the other in all but formal order of precedence.

These include:

 Coadjutor bishop, or Coadjutor archbishop
 Coadjutor vicar, or Coadjutor apostolic vicar
 Coadjutor eparch, or Coadjutor archeparch 
 Coadjutor exarch, or Coadjutor apostolic exarch

Overview
The office is ancient. "Coadjutor", in the 1883 Catholic Dictionary, says:

Another source identifies three kinds of coadjutors:
(1) Temporal and revocable.
(2) Perpetual and irrevocable.
(3) Perpetual, with the right of future succession.

It describes:

See also
Bishop (disambiguation)
Vicar (disambiguation)
Exarch (disambiguation)

References

Bishops by type
Catholic ecclesiastical titles
Ecclesiastical titles
Episcopacy in the Catholic Church
Anglican episcopal offices